Stephen A. Smith (born May 15, 1949) is a University of Arkansas communications professor who was a top gubernatorial aide to Bill Clinton in Arkansas, helping the governor run his office. He is an internationally known First Amendment scholar and author of numerous books.

Smith became part of Ken Starr's investigation during  the Whitewater scandal; he remained loyal to  Clinton. Smith confessed to getting a phony loan from David Hale's company, saying it was to go for a "disadvantaged" political consulting firm Smith operated in the 1980s. The $65,000 loan in fact was for an overdue bank loan Smith had with Jim Guy Tucker. He pleaded guilty on June 8, 1995, to one misdemeanor count of conspiracy.

Smith received a presidential pardon in 2001, one of 140 controversial pardons Clinton issued on his last day of his presidency.

Smith wrote a fictional book, The Star Chamber, about his experiences under the pen name John Wilkes.

References
 CBS News, Caught In The Whitewater Net, Washington, May 19, 1998
 April 28, 1996, President Clinton testified under oath (see Court TV).
 Time, Would You Pardon Them?, Feb. 18, 2001

External links
 The Star Chamber, Amazon.com

Recipients of American presidential pardons
1949 births
Living people
University of Arkansas faculty
American sociologists
Arkansas Democrats
Whitewater controversy